KMI may refer to:
 Kentucky Military Institute, a defunct military educational institution in Kentucky.
 IATA airport code for Miyazaki Airport in Miyazaki, Japan.
 Koninklijk Meteorologisch Instituut or Königliche Meteorologische Institut, the Dutch  or German name of the Belgian national weather service
 AT&T High Seas Service, callsign KMI
 Kinesis Myofascial Integration - an alternative medicine therapy
 Korea Maritime Institute, a think tank and research center developing South Korean policies on marine affairs and fisheries
 Kinder Morgan Inc. (NYSE:KMI), the fourth largest energy company in North America.